Samata Sainik Dal, (Army of Soldiers for Equality or Party of the Fighters for Equality) abbreviated as SSD, is a social organisation founded by B. R. Ambedkar on 24 September 1924 with the objective of safeguarding the rights of all oppressed sections of Indian society.
All India Equality Force

Awards
 Dr. Ambedkar National Award (2012)

Gallery

References

External links

 

Organizations established in 1927
Volunteer organisations in India
Scheduled Castes
B. R. Ambedkar
Dalit politics
Organisations based in Maharashtra
1927 establishments in India